In mathematics, an argument of a function is a value provided to obtain the function's result. It is also called an independent variable.

The hypergeometric function is an example of a four-argument function. The number of arguments that a function takes is called the arity of the function. A function of two or more variables is considered to have a domain consisting of ordered pairs or tuples of argument values. The argument of a circular function is an angle. The argument of a hyperbolic function is a hyperbolic angle.

A mathematical function has one or more arguments in the form of independent variables designated in the definition, which can also contain parameters. The independent variables are mentioned in the list of arguments that the function takes, whereas the parameters are not. For example, in the logarithmic function  the base  is considered a parameter. 

Sometimes, subscripts can be used to denote arguments. For example, we can use subscripts to denote the arguments with respect to which partial derivatives are taken.

The use of the term "argument" in this sense developed from astronomy, which historically used tables to determine the spatial positions of planets from their positions in the sky (ephemerides). These tables were organized according to measured angles called arguments, literally "that which elucidates something else."

See also

References

External links

 
 

Elementary mathematics